Geir Pollen (born 4 April 1953 in Målselv) is a Norwegian poet, novelist and translator. His literary debut was the poetry collection Posteringar i språket from 1982. He was leader of the Norwegian Authors' Union from 2001 to 2005.

References

1953 births
Living people
People from Målselv
20th-century Norwegian novelists
21st-century Norwegian novelists
20th-century Norwegian poets
Norwegian male poets
Norwegian translators
Norwegian male novelists
Norwegian schoolteachers
20th-century Norwegian male writers
21st-century Norwegian male writers